Kermi may refer to:

 Kermi, Nepal, a village in Nepal
 Kermi bog, also known as a "kermi", a type of raised bog